Timothy Olmstead (1759–1848) was a Connecticut psalmodist and one of the first American composers. He was also a Connecticut fifer during the American Revolutionary war.

Scores
Collected Works of Eliakim Doolittle (1772-1850) and Timothy Olmstead (1759-1848): Music of the New American Nation Sacred Music from 1780 to 1820 Published: 1999, Publisher: Taylor & Francis Inc -

References

1759 births
1848 deaths
American male composers
19th-century American composers
Shape note
People of Connecticut in the American Revolution
18th-century American musicians
18th-century American composers
18th-century male musicians
Fife players
19th-century American male musicians